Teodoro Cottrau (7 December 1827, in Naples – 30 March 1879, in Naples) was an Italian composer, lyricist, publisher, journalist and politician. He specialised in "folksy" Neapolitan songs.

His arrangement of Santa Lucia was published in 1850 and recorded among others by Enrico Caruso and Elvis Presley.

French composer and musicologist Guillaume Louis Cottrau was his father.

References

External links 
 

Italian lyricists
Italian publishers (people)
Italian journalists
Italian male journalists
Italian politicians
1827 births
1879 deaths
19th-century Italian composers